St. Clair Square is a shopping mall in Fairview Heights, Illinois, United States. Opened in 1974, the mall features Macy's, Dillard's, and JCPenney as its anchor stores. It is managed by CBL & Associates Properties. The mall formerly had a Sears, which closed in 2019.

History
The May Department Stores Company, through its subsidiary May Centers, Inc., built the mall in 1974 with Famous-Barr, JCPenney, and Sears. Stix Baer & Fuller built a store on the mall site in 1979. This store became Dillard's in 1984.

It was sold to The Hahn Company in 1989. A food court was added in the early 1990s. Hahn then sold it to CBL & Associates Properties in 1996. At the time, it was the fifth-largest mall in the St. Louis, Missouri metropolitan area. Famous-Barr became Macy's in 2006.

On December 28, 2018, it was announced that Sears would be closing as part of a plan to close 80 stores nationwide. The store closed in March 2019.

In late 2020, the mall experienced two shootings. The first occurred on August 19, 2020, outside of the entrance to the mall's food court. There were no reported injuries, but one window sustained damage. The second occurred on October 4, 2020, after a dispute inside of the mall. There were no reported injuries, but several windows sustained damage.

References

External links
St. Clair Square

Shopping malls established in 1974
CBL Properties
Shopping malls in Illinois
Buildings and structures in St. Clair County, Illinois